George Wegner Paus (14 October 1882 – 22 December 1923), often known as George Paus, was a Norwegian lawyer, mountaineer, skiing pioneer and business executive. He was Director at the Norwegian Employers' Confederation. As such, he played an important role in labour issues in Norway and in the development of Norwegian labour law from the early 20th century. He participated in the establishment of the International Labour Organization in 1919 as a representative of the Norwegian government and was a member of several governmental committees.

He was one of Norway's most active mountaineers in the early 1900s with several first ascents in Jotunheimen; his regular mountaineering partners included his close friend Kristian Tandberg, pioneering female mountaineer Therese Bertheau whom he knew since childhood, and some of the most famous British mountaineers of the era including Harold Raeburn. He was also an avid sailor and rower, and was the founder and chairman of the ski club Starkad from 1897, described in the book Vinterlivets rene glæder (The Joy of Winter Life). He also wrote poetry.

Career

He graduated with the cand.jur. degree at The Royal Frederick's in 1904. After briefly working as a barrister with his own practice in Oslo, he was consular secretary at the newly established Norwegian consulate in Chicago from 1905 to 1907.

In 1907, he was employed as Secretary, effectively general counsel, at the newly founded Norwegian Employers' Confederation, becoming its second management-level employee and its first lawyer. In 1918 he became Director. He was part of the Norwegian delegation at the conference that established the International Labour Organization in 1919, together with Johan Castberg and others.

Paus was one of the most active mountaineers in Norway around 1900 with several first ascents. He also wrote poetry.

Background
He was a son of the theologian Bernhard Pauss and Anna Henriette Wegner. He was a brother of the surgeon and humanitarian Nikolai Nissen Paus and of the industrial leader Augustin Paus, and a grandson of the industrialist Benjamin Wegner. He was named for his uncle, the supreme court advocate George Mygind Wegner (1847–1881), who in turn was named for the former British consul in Oslo and family friend, George Mygind (died 1844).

References

1882 births
1923 deaths
University of Oslo alumni
20th-century Norwegian lawyers